Austra is a Canadian electronic music band from Toronto, founded in 2009 by composer, singer-songwriter, and producer Katie Stelmanis. Stelmanis is the only permanent member of the project, with a rotating live band that has included Maya Postepski (drums), Dorian Wolf (bass, Moog), and Ryan Wonsiak (keyboards). It previously also featured the twin backing singers Sari and Romy Lightman of Tasseomancy. The band has released four studio albums—Feel It Break (2011), Olympia (2013), Future Politics (2017), and Hirudin (2020).

History

Formation and early years
In 2004, Stelmanis and Postepski played in a band called Galaxy, together with Emma McKenna. At the same time, Stelmanis started making electronic music at home and was also writing industrial-inspired soundtracks for performance artist Zeesy Powers. Powers convinced her to start performing her songs live, and in 2008 Stelmanis' debut album Join Us, which appeared under her own name, was released through Blocks Recording Club. She toured Europe with Postepski on drums and xylosynth. In 2009, Stelmanis decided to change the name of the project from her own in order to increase her bandmates' visibility, and because she felt too many people were mistaking the project for being an acoustic-folk act.

In 2010, Stelmanis recruited Dorian Wolf and Carmen Elle as live members. The band played the South by South West festival in Austin, Texas, under the name Private Life. An A&R from Domino Records saw the show and Stelmanis subsequently signed a record deal with the label. After learning the band name Private Life was taken, Stelmanis decided to use her middle name, Austra, which is also the name of the goddess of light in Latvian mythology.

2011–2013: Feel It Break
Austra's debut studio album, Feel It Break was released on May 11, 2011, by Domino Records, and May 17, 2011, in Canada by Paper Bag Records. The album was shortlisted for the 2011 Polaris Music Prize. Feel It Break was included on several year-end critics' lists; notably, both the Toronto Star and New York named it the best album of 2011, with the former calling it "an outright stunner". Stereogum named Austra a Band to Watch in March 2011. Stelmanis wrote and produced all the tracks on the album. Maya added additional production on Lose It, The Future, The Choke and The Villain. The record was mixed by Damian Taylor in Montreal.

2013–present: Olympia and Future Politics
Their second album Olympia was released on June 18, 2013. It was preceded by the lead single "Home", released on March 7, 2013. It was described as "a personal song cycle about loss and gender dynamics". Their third album Future Politics was released on January 20, 2017. For the record, Stelmanis spent time in Mexico where she was introduced to electro cumbia while house, dance and techno music influenced the writing for the album. Lyrically, Stelmanis was inspired by the book Inventing the Future: Postcapitalism and a World Without Work by Nick Srnicek and Alex Williams and The Accelerationist Manifesto. She indicated that the material for the record had been written before the political events in the second half of 2016.

In 2020, Austra released the album HiRUDin, which Pitchfork called 'the most dynamic of Austra's albums". It was produced by Rodaidh McDonald and features contributions from Cecile Believe and Joseph Shabason.

Discography

Studio albums

Remix albums
 Sparkle (2011)

EPs
 Beat and the Pulse (2010)
 Habitat (2014)

Singles
 "Lose It" (2011)
 "Spellwork" (2011)
 "Home" (2013)
 "Painful Like" (2013)
 "Forgive Me" (2013)
 "Hurt Me Now" (2014)
 "Habitat" (2014)
 "American Science" (2014)
 "Utopia" (2016)
 "Future Politics" (2016)
 "I Love You More Than You Love Yourself" (2017)
 "Change the Paradigm" (2017)
 "Risk It" (2020)
 "Anywayz" (2020)
 "I Am Not Waiting" (2020)

References

External links
 

2009 establishments in Ontario
Art pop groups
Canadian dark wave musical groups
Canadian new wave musical groups
Canadian synthpop groups
Domino Recording Company artists
Musical groups established in 2009
Musical groups from Toronto
Musical quartets
Paper Bag Records artists